Bullingdon Green was a cricket ground south of Oxford, England. It was associated with the Bullingdon Club and was an important site in the early history of cricket in Oxford. The ground operated as a first-class cricket venue in 1843, hosting two first-class matches. It was subsequently built on in 1876 with the Cowley Barracks.

History
The "large open space" of Bullingdon Green formerly stood between Horspath and Cowley. Cricket is recorded as being played at Bullingdon Green as early as 1764. The Bullingdon Club played minor matches at the ground at the beginning of the 19th century, however cricket at the ground was often secondary to dinners and equestrian pursuits. By the 1820s, it had developed a reputation for hosting unsupervised social gatherings, with R. W. Browne commenting that "the Magdalen [Club] was the only real University Cricket Club, as the Bullingdon was more of a fashionable lounge for those who could keep horses." The distance from Oxford and a serious need to focus on cricket necessitated the requirement for a cricket ground closer to the city, with the establishment of the Magdalen Ground in 1829, which was leased to the Oxford University Cricket Club. 

Bullingdon Green would go on to host first-class cricket for Oxford University in 1843, due to flooding at the Magdalen Ground. The first fixture which was moved to the ground was that seasons 'grand match' against the Marylebone Cricket Club, while the second was The University Match against Cambridge University. Frederick Lillywhite was of the opinion that the turf at Bullingdon Green was the finest he had ever played on, even finer than the turf at his own ground in Brighton. The ground remained in use until the 1870s, at which point the Cardwell Reforms which encouraged the localisation of British military forces were set in motion. In 1873, early inspections took place for the creation of a military centre on Bullingdon Green. The location of the cricket ground was subsequently chosen for the construction of the Cowley Barracks, which were completed in 1876.

Records

First-class
Highest team total: 141 all out by Cambridge University v Oxford University, 1843
Lowest team total: 44 all out by Oxford University v Marylebone Cricket Club, 1843
Highest individual innings: 44 by Francis Grimston for Cambridge University v Oxford University, 1843
Best bowling in an innings: 7-? by Henry Moberly for Oxford University v Marylebone Cricket Club, 1843
Best bowling in a match: 14-? by Henry Moberly, as above

References

External links
Bullingdon Green at ESPNcricinfo

1764 establishments in England
University of Oxford sites
Sport at the University of Oxford
Cricket grounds in Oxfordshire
Defunct cricket grounds in England
Oxford University Cricket Club
Parks and open spaces in Oxford
Defunct sports venues in Oxford
1876 disestablishments in England
Sports venues completed in 1843